"Tutu" (English: "You-you") is a song by Colombian singer Camilo and Puerto Rican singer Pedro Capó. The song was written by Camilo and its producers, Jon Leone and Richi Lopez. It was released on 9 August 2019. Due to the song's success, a remix with fellow singer Shakira was released on 15 October 2019.

"Tutu" is a pop song based on urban beats. The lyrics were inspired by the love Camilo feels for his girlfriend, Evaluna Montaner, who is also the protagonist of the music video.

Live performances
On November 24, 2019, Camilo and Pedro Capó joined Shakira to perform the remix version of the song at the closing ceremony of the 2019 Davis Cup in Madrid.

Shakira remix

Background and release
In October 2019, Shakira posted a video of herself singing along to “Tutu” on Instagram. She captioned the video saying “I can’t get this song out of my head!”. She privately messaged Echeverry, asking to record a remix of the song.

Critical reception
In Rolling Stone, Lucas Villa viewed the "Tutu" remix as an "airy, feminine touch, treating Echeverry’s lyrics with the utmost care."

Charts

Weekly charts

Year-end charts

Certifications

See also
List of Billboard Argentina Hot 100 number-one singles of 2019
 List of airplay number-one hits of the 2010s (Argentina)

References

2019 songs
2019 singles
Camilo (singer) songs
Pedro Capó songs
Shakira songs
Sony Music Latin singles
Spanish-language songs
Songs written by Camilo (singer)
Argentina Hot 100 number-one singles
Latin Grammy Award for Best Pop Song